Sarah Ssentongo Kisauzi is a Ugandan actress most known for her role as Nalweyiso, the mean mother-in-law, in the 2013 NTV television drama series Deception.

Career
Mrs. Kisauzi came into the limelight as Nalweyiso, a role she played in a drama series Deception from 2013 to 2016 and won her the Best Actress award at the 2015 Uganda Entertainment Awards. She later played other roles such as in the Disney chess film Queen of Katwe as Katende's grandmother in 2016, Ugandan telenovela Second Chance. She played Mama Stella in a 2019 gender based violence campaign film Bed of Thorns and as Barbara Batte in a 2019 television drama series Power of Legacy.
Mrs. Kisauzi has also starred in Usama Mukwaya’s 2012 short film Smart Attempt, and in Mariam Ndagire’s productions Because of you, Hearts in Pieces (2009) and Where we Belong (2011). It was announced in that Mrs. Kisauzi got a role in a Hollywood production titled "Little America"

Filmography

Awards & Nominations

References

External links

 

Living people
Ugandan actresses
1948 births